The 1992–93 Macedonian First League was the first season of the Macedonian First Football League, the highest football league of Macedonia. It was the initial season, after Republic of Macedonia's independence from Yugoslavia. The first matches of the season were played on 23 August 1992 and the last on 13 June 1993. Vardar won the first championship title without loss.

Participating teams 
The two teams (Pelister and Vardar) was qualified from the Yugoslav First League, another two teams (Balkan and Teteks) was qualified from the Yugoslav Second League, the seven teams (Belasica, Borec, Bregalnica, Makedonija Gjorche Petrov, Osogovo, Pobeda and Sileks) was qualified from the Yugoslav Inter-Republic League East and the rest of the teams (FCU 55, Metalurg, Rudar, Sasa, Sloga Jugomagnat, Tikvesh and Vardarski) was qualified from the Macedonian Republic League.

League table

Results

Top goalscorers

See also 
 1992–93 Macedonian Football Cup
 1992–93 Macedonian Second Football League

References

External links 
 Macedonia - List of final tables (RSSSF)
 Football Federation of Macedonia
 MAK.pdf

Macedonia
1
Macedonian First Football League seasons